Thbeng Meanchey Airport or Preah Vinhear Airport  is a public use airport located near Thbeng Meanchey, Siĕm Reăb, Cambodia.

See also
List of airports in Cambodia

References

External links 
 Airport record for Thbeng Meanchey Airport at Landings.com

Airports in Cambodia
Buildings and structures in Siem Reap province